The South American Basketball Championship 1966 was the 20th edition of this regional tournament. It was held from December 2 to 12 in Mendoza, San Juan, Argentina. Eight teams competed.

Results

The final standings were determined by a round robin, where the 8 teams played against each other once.

|}

References
FIBA Archive

1966
Championship
International basketball competitions hosted by Argentina
1966 in Argentine sport
Sports competitions in Buenos Aires
1960s in Buenos Aires
February 1966 sports events in South America